This list of castles in the Centre-Val de Loire region is a list of medieval castles or châteaux forts in this French region.

Links in italics are links to articles in the French Wikipedia.

Cher

Castles of which little or nothing remains include 
Château de Montrond.

Eure-et-Loir

Indre

Indre-et-Loire

Loir-et-Cher

Loiret

See also
 List of castles in France
 List of châteaux in France

References

 Centre (French region)